The seventh generation of the BMW 7 Series (model code G70) are luxury saloons consisting of internal combustion versions and a battery electric version known as the BMW i7. It was introduced by BMW on 20 April 2022 during the nameplate's 45th anniversary.

Overview 
The G70 7 Series is offered with petrol, petrol plug-in hybrid, diesel, and battery electric powertrains, with the latter being marketed as the i7. A V12 petrol engine option is no longer offered. The vehicle is only available in long-wheelbase form, with  longer exterior dimensions,  wider and  taller compared to the previous generation long-wheelbase model.

In Europe, initial range only includes the i7, while internal combustion versions will be available at a later date which are 740d xDrive with  B57 3.0-litre turbo six-cylinder, along with two plug-in hybrid models which are 750e xDrive and M760e xDrive which will also be offered worldwide. The M760e xDrive will be the successor to the V12-powered M760i.

In North America, three trims are available for late 2022 introduction, including the i7 xDrive60. The internal combustion versions are the 740i and 760i xDrive, both equipped with mild hybrid.

In Thailand, three trims are available for November 2022 introduction, including the i7 xDrive60 in 3 Models M Sport (First Edition) / M Sport and the range-topping M Sport Gran Lusso. The internal combustion version with plug-in hybrid model is 750e xDrive M Sport CKD introduction in 2023.

References

External links 
 

G70
7 Series (G70)
Cars introduced in 2022
Full-size vehicles
Limousines
Plug-in hybrid vehicles
Rear-wheel-drive vehicles
All-wheel-drive vehicles
Production electric cars